Rugose means "wrinkled". It may refer to:

 Rugosa, an extinct order of coral, whose rugose shape earned it the name
 Rugose, adjectival form of rugae

Species with "rugose" in their names
 Idiosoma nigrum, more commonly, a black rugose trapdoor spider
 Rugose spiraling whitefly